The Floyd B. Brown House is a historic house at 1401 South Georgia Street in Pine Bluff, Arkansas.  It is a single-story vernacular brick structure, with a gable roof and brick foundation.  Decorative elements on the building are minimal, with scalloped trim elements at the gables and eaves, and a fanlight in the front-facing gable.  The house was built in 1954 for Floyd and Lillian Brown.  The Browns were prominent African-American educators: Floyd Brown founded the Fargo Training School in Fargo, Arkansas, and his wife Lillian taught there.

The house was listed on the National Register of Historic Places in 2006.  It was delisted in 2018.

See also
National Register of Historic Places listings in Jefferson County, Arkansas

References

Houses completed in 1955
Houses in Pine Bluff, Arkansas
Houses on the National Register of Historic Places in Arkansas
National Register of Historic Places in Pine Bluff, Arkansas
Former National Register of Historic Places in Arkansas
1955 establishments in Arkansas